Cabo San Roque is a Spanish musical group from Catalonia. The band is a large collective of performers based in Barcelona. Cabo San Roque is especially notable for its creation of experimental musical instruments (e.g., a re-purposed washing machine and a cello made from the body of a suitcase) and its fusion of "traditional" and experimental music.

Cabo San Roque has been profiled on PRI's The World.

Discography
Música a Màquina. Self-released, 2008.
França Xica. g3g records, 2005.
CaboSanRoque. g3g records, 2005. (probably released earlier)
Contes. (collaboration with TaNtágORa) 2006.
Membrillo EP. CaboSanRoque vs Luciano Bruchstuecke 13th. 12.

References

External links 
  

Musical groups from Catalonia